The Terry Evanshen Trophy is a trophy awarded to the Canadian Football League East Division's Most Outstanding Player, chosen from the nominees of each team in the division.  Either this trophy winner or the winner of the Jeff Nicklin Memorial Trophy will also receive the Canadian Football League Most Outstanding Player Award.

The Evanshen Trophy was named for Terry Evanshen, who was a star wide receiver for the Montreal Alouettes, the Calgary Stampeders, the Hamilton Tiger-Cats and the Toronto Argonauts. After his retirement from football, Terry Evanshen was involved in a car crash in 1988 that nearly killed and caused him to have severe brain damage, which caused him to have memory loss. Evanshen was able to successfully overcome his battle with memory loss and lives a full life.

In 1994, the CFL adopted the Terry Evanshen Trophy to be awarded annually to the Most Outstanding Player of the East Division. The Terry Evanshen Trophy ended up replacing the Jeff Russel Memorial Trophy which was officially retired in 1994 at the request of the Russel family (it was re-established in 2003 to recognize the players in the Quebec conference of U Sports football, with the winner being nominated for the national Hec Crighton Trophy). As part of the failed American expansion in 1995, the trophy was awarded to the Most Outstanding Player of the South Division.

Terry Evanshen Trophy winners
Bold indicates a player who went on to win the CFL's Most Outstanding Player Award

''See Jeff Russel Memorial Trophy to view other recipients of the Most Outstanding Player of the East Division.

References
CFL Publications: 2011 Facts, Figures & Records
CFL Publications: 2012 Facts, Figures & Records
CFL Publications: 2013 Facts, Figures & Records
CFL Publications: 2014 Facts, Figures & Records

Canadian Football League trophies and awards